Ephraim Tjihonge (born 23 May 1986) is a Namibian football goalkeeper who currently plays for South African National First Division club Milano United.

He previously played for South African clubs African Warriors and Black Leopards. In Namibia he played for SK Windhoek, Civics FC and Black Africa.

He was a part of the Namibian squad at the 2008 African Cup of Nations. He also represented Namibia in a March 2011 friendly against Botswana.

References

External links

1986 births
Living people
Association football goalkeepers
Namibian men's footballers
Namibian expatriate footballers
Namibia international footballers
2008 Africa Cup of Nations players
F.C. Civics Windhoek players
Black Africa S.C. players
Black Leopards F.C. players
Milano United F.C. players
Expatriate soccer players in South Africa
Namibian expatriate sportspeople in South Africa
SK Windhoek players
African Warriors F.C. players